The 2019–20 Missouri Valley Conference men's basketball season began with practices in October 2019, followed by the start of the 2019–20 NCAA Division I men's basketball season on November 5, 2019. Conference play began in late December 2019 and concluded in March with the Missouri Valley Conference tournament at Enterprise Center in St. Louis, Missouri.

Northern Iowa captured the regular season title at 14–4.

Bradley defeated Valparaiso in the championship game to win the Missouri Valley Conference tournament and thereby would have received the conference's automatic bid to the NCAA tournament.

Northern Iowa, by virtue of winning the regular season title, but not winning the conference tournament, would have received the conference's automatic bid to the National Invitational tournament.

All subsequent postseason tournaments were canceled due to the COVID-19 pandemic.

Head Coaches

Changes 
On March 6, 2019, Southern Illinois head coach Barry Hinson resigned. He finished with a seven-year record of 116–106. The school announced on March 20 that former Loyola-Chicago associate head coach (and Saluki alumnus) Bryan Mullins had been named head coach.

Coaches

Notes: 
 All records, appearances, titles, etc. are from time with current school only. 
 Overall and MVC records are from time at current school and are through the beginning of the season.
 Lottich and Moser's conference records only includes MVC play, not other conference records.

Preseason

Poll 
Source

All-Conference Teams

Source

Regular season

Changes 
On December 27, 2019, Evansville placed head coach Walter McCarty on administrative leave and named current Evanville assistant coach (and former Samford head coach) Bennie Seltzer as interim head coach. McCarty was in his second season at the school with an overall record at the time of 20–25. The school terminated McCarty's contract on January 21, 2020 and announced later that same day that former Marian, Butler and Iowa head coach, as well as Evansville associate head coach, Todd Lickliter would return as head coach, effective immediately.

Conference Matrix
This table summarizes head-to-head results between teams in conference play; each team will play eighteen conference games, facing each team twice.

Postseason

Coaches
Source

Source

All-Conference Teams
Source

Source

Conference tournament

References

 
Missouri Valley Conference men's basketball tournament